White Horse is an unincorporated community in Bucks County, in the U.S. state of Pennsylvania.

History
The community took its name from the White Horse inn, established in 1757.

References

Unincorporated communities in Bucks County, Pennsylvania
Unincorporated communities in Pennsylvania